Anjuman (English: Congregation) is a 1986 Hindi drama film directed by Muzaffar Ali, starring Shabana Azmi, Farooque Shaikh and Rohini Hattangadi in lead roles. Set in Lucknow, it deals with exploitation of women and problems of local "chikan" embroidery workers.

Anjuman has music by Khayyam, with lyrics by noted Urdu poet Shahryar, with three songs sung by lead actress Shabana Azmi, who agreed to do playback singing. Noted actor Farooque Shaikh worked in three films with Muzaffar Ali, with the others being Gaman (1978) and Umrao Jaan (1981).

Cast
 Shabana Azmi as Anjuman
 Farooque Shaikh as Sajid (Sajju)
 Rohini Hattangadi as Dr. Suchitra Sharma
 Mushtaq Khan as Banke Nawab
 Shaukat Azmi

Music
The music was by Khayyam, with lyrics by Shahryar and Faiz Ahmad Faiz, with three song sung by Shabana Azmi, a rare feat for her career.

 "Kab Yaad Me Tera Saath Nahin" — Jagjit Kaur, Khayyam
 "Main Raah Kab Se Nayi Zindagi Ki" — Shabana Azmi
 "Tujhse Hoti Bhi To Kya" — Shabana Azmi
 "Aisa Nahin Ki Isko" — Shabana Azmi
 "Gulab Jism Ka" — Bhupinder Singh, Shabana Azmi

References

External links
 

1986 films
1980s Hindi-language films
Films directed by Muzaffar Ali
Films scored by Khayyam
Indian drama films
Films set in Lucknow
Culture of Lucknow
1980s Urdu-language films
1986 drama films
Hindi-language drama films
Faiz Ahmad Faiz
Urdu-language Indian films